Mikk Reintam (born 22 May 1990) is a retired Estonian professional footballer who last played as a centre back for Meistriliiga club Nõmme Kalju FC. Internationally he played for the Estonia national team in 12 matches.

Club career

Flora
Reintam came through the youth system at Flora and played for the club's affiliates Warrior. He made his debut for Flora's first team on 3 March 2009, against Levadia in the Estonian Supercup, and scored the first goal of a 2–1 win. Reintam made his debut in the Meistriliiga on 7 March 2009, and scored the only goal of an away win against Nõmme Kalju.

In July 2010, Reintam moved to Tulevik on loan until the end of the 2010 season.

JJK
On 7 March 2011, Reintam signed a three-year contract with Finnish club JJK. He made his debut in the Veikkausliiga on 12 May 2011, in a 2–1 away victory over RoPS. His club finished the 2011 season in third place, their highest position in history.

Nõmme Kalju
On 15 February 2014, Reintam signed a one-year contract with Meistriliiga club Nõmme Kalju. He was named Player of the Month for April 2014.

Frýdek-Místek
In April 2015, Reintam signed for Czech National League club Frýdek-Místek.

Alloa Athletic
On 7 July 2015, Reintam signed a one-year contract with Scottish Championship club Alloa Athletic. He made his debut for the club on 1 August 2015 in a Scottish League Cup match against Berwick Rangers, losing the game 2–3 in extra time. Reintam made his debut in the Scottish Championship on 8 August 2015, in a 1–3 away loss to Queen of the South. He failed to establish himself in the first team squad after new manager Jack Ross took over in December 2015, and on 24 March 2016 his contract was terminated by mutual agreement.

Třinec
In April 2016, Reintam signed for Czech National League club Třinec.

International career
Reintam began his international career for Estonia with the national under-18 team in 2007, and went on to represent the under-19, under-21, and under-23 national sides.

On 25 May 2011, Reintam made an unofficial senior debut for Estonia, in a 1–2 home loss to Basque Country in a non-FIFA match. On 10 June 2011, he was named by manager Tarmo Rüütli in the Estonia squad to face Chile and Uruguay in friendly matches. Reintam made his senior international debut on 19 June 2011, in a 0–4 away loss to Chile.

Career statistics

Club

International

Honours

Club
Flora
Estonian Cup: 2008–09
Estonian Supercup: 2009

References

External links

1990 births
Living people
Footballers from Tallinn
Estonian footballers
Association football central defenders
Esiliiga players
FC Warrior Valga players
Meistriliiga players
FC Flora players
Viljandi JK Tulevik players
Nõmme Kalju FC players
Veikkausliiga players
JJK Jyväskylä players
Czech National Football League players
FK Frýdek-Místek players
FK Fotbal Třinec players
Scottish Professional Football League players
Alloa Athletic F.C. players
Estonia youth international footballers
Estonia under-21 international footballers
Estonia international footballers
Estonian expatriate footballers
Estonian expatriate sportspeople in Finland
Expatriate footballers in Finland
Estonian expatriate sportspeople in the Czech Republic
Expatriate footballers in the Czech Republic
Estonian expatriate sportspeople in Scotland
Expatriate footballers in Scotland